A recognizable community of Chinese people in Korea has existed since the 1880s, and are often known as Hwagyo. Over 90% of early Chinese migrants came from Shandong province on the east coast of China. These ethnic Chinese residents in Korea often held Republic of China citizenship. The Republic of China used to govern the entirety of China, but now only governs Taiwan and parts of Fujian. Due to the conflation of Republic of China citizenship with Taiwanese identity in the modern era, these ethnic Chinese people in Korea or Hwagyo are now usually referred to as "Taiwanese". However, in reality most Hwagyo hold little to no ties with Taiwan. 

After the People's Republic of China (PRC)'s "reform and opening up" and subsequent normalization of China–South Korea relations, a new wave of Chinese migration to South Korea has occurred. In 2009, more than half of the South Korea's 1.1 million foreign residents were PRC citizens; 71% of those are Joseonjok, PRC citizens of Korean ethnicity. There is also a small community of PRC citizens in North Korea. 

On July 15, 2020, a museum dedicated to the history of Chinese people in Korea (韓華歷史博物館) opened in Seoul.  Situated on the campus of the Seoul Overseas Chinese High School in Seodaemun-gu, it showcases many artifacts documenting the history of Chinese people in Korea, dating back 150 years. These were mostly donated by the Korean Chinese and their descendents in South Korea.  They tell the difficulties Chinese people face in Korea and their struggle to overcome and prosper.

Terminology

When writing in English, scholars use a number of different terms to refer to Chinese people in Korea, often derived from Sino-Korean vocabulary. The Korean reading is often shortened to hwagyo (also spelled ), which simply means "overseas Chinese" but in English literature typically refers specifically to the overseas Chinese of Korea. Other authors call them huaqiao, but this term might be used to refer to overseas Chinese in any country, not just Korea, so sometimes a qualifier is added, for example "Korean-Huaqiao". The terms "Chinese Korean" and "Korean Chinese" are also seen. However, this usage may be confused with Koreans in China, who are also referred to by both such names.

Early history

According to a journal article by Korean geneticists Wook Kim and Han Jun Jin, Korean people have detectable amounts of Han Chinese paternal ancestry. China's Y haplogroup O-M175 and its subclades are also found among 75% of Koreans. In central China around the Yangze river rice cultivation developed and by 1000 BC came to the entire Korean Peninsula according to archaeological remains which may have bought Chinese haplogroups. In Historical recorded times, during China's Warring States era the kingdom of Gojoseon in Korea became a refuge for many fleeing Han Chinese. China was filled with Han Chinese as eastward and southward migration according in 476-221 BC in the Warring states period in mainland China and 4,000 years ago the Yangtze river received Chinese migrants from the northern Yellow river. China's yellow river region near south Shanxi province and Henan is the origin of the 47z-Y2 mutation on the O-SRY+465 which is found in a massive amount in Koreans. Japanese and Koreans also possess the SRY+465-T mutation. Meanwhile the Siberian and Mongolian origin C-RPS4Y711 Y haplogroup is found in 15% of Koreans. Japanese have 6% and Koreans have 11% of the Altaic origin C2 (M217) Y haplogroup which indicates that if Japanese and Koreans are Altaic, the Altaic languages did not spread via paternal descent in Japan and Korea.

Jizi came to Korea during the Shang dynasty and established Gija Joseon and Wiman of Gojoseon came from Han dynasty China and established Wiman Joseon.

Chinese colonists settled in the Four Commanderies of Han after the Han dynasty conquered Wiman Joseon, especially in Lelang Commandery. Ethnic Han colonies peasants were set up at Lelang.

Other minority ethnicities from China such as the Xianbei, Khitan, and Jurchen also migrated into the Korean peninsula.

Fleeing from the Mongols, in 1216 the Khitans invaded Goryeo and defeated the Korean armies multiple times, even reaching the gates of the capital and raiding deep into the south, but were defeated by Korean General Kim Chwi-ryeo who pushed them back north to Pyongan, where the remaining Khitans were finished off by allied Mongol-Goryeo forces in 1219. These Khitans are possibly the origin of the Baekjeong.

Xianbei descendants among the Korean population carry surnames such as Mo, Seok Sŏk Sek, Won Wŏn, Dokgo.

One of Mencius' descendants moved to Korea and founded the Sinchang Maeng clan. A Chinese descended from a student of Confucius founded the Muncheon Gong clan and Gimpo Gong clan in Korea.

During the Yuan dynasty, one of Confucius' descendants, who was one of the sons of Duke Yansheng , named Kong Shao, moved from China to Goryeo era Korea and established a branch of the family there called the Gong clan of Qufu after marrying a Korean woman, the daughter of Jo Jin-gyeong during Toghon Temür's rule. This branch of the family received aristocratic rank in Joseon era Korea. 曲阜孔氏 (朝鲜半岛) 곡부 공씨

Two Japanese families, a Vietnamese family, an Arab family, a Uighur family, four Manchuria originated families, three Mongol families, and 83 Chinese families migrated into Korea during Goryeo.

Goryeo era Korea accepted Lý dynasty of Vietnam as royal refugees. The Lý familial origins were from south China. Fujian province, Jinjiang village, was the origin of Lý Thái Tổ, the ancestor of the Lý dynasty ruling family and Lý Công Uẩn. These sources have been confirmed by Trần Quốc Vượng.

Chen Li went to Korea. The Chinese Ming Xia emperor Ming Yuzhen's son Ming Sheng was given the noble title Marquis of Guiyi by the Ming dynasty emperor Zhu Yuanzhang after his surrender. Ming Sheng was then exiled to Korea and Zhu Yuanzhang asked the Korean king to treat him as a foreign noble by giving his descendants and family corvée and taxation exemptions. These were granted by a patent from the Korean king which lasted until the invading soldiers in the Qing invasion of Joseon destroyed the Ming family's patents. The Korean official Yun Hui-chong's daughter married Ming Sheng in March 1373. Ming Sheng was 17 and Chen Li was 21 when they were sent to Korea in 1372 by the Ming dynasty. The Chinese Ming family exists as the Korean clans, Yeonan Myeong clan, Seochok Myeong clan and Namwon Seung clan.

Individual Chinese are recorded on the Korean Peninsula as early as the 13th century, with some going on to found Korean clans. However, there was little recognisable community until July 1882, when the Qing dynasty sent Admiral  and 3,000 troops at the request of the Korean government to aid in quelling a rebellion. Accompanying the troops were some 40 Chinese merchants and other civilians. In August that same year, Qing Superintendent for Trade for the Northern Ports Li Hongzhang lifted restrictions on coastal trade and signed the Regulations for Maritime and Overland Trade Between Chinese and Korean Subjects, and two further agreements the following year, which granted Chinese merchants permission to trade in Korea.

Unlike in other Asian countries, 90% of the early overseas Chinese in Korea came from Shandong, rather than the southern coastal provinces of Guangdong and Fujian. During the late 19th and early 20th century Shandong was hard hit by famine, drought, and banditry especially in its northwest, and caused many to migrate to other parts of Shandong, China, and Korea. See Shandong people. Chinese merchants did well in competition with the Japanese due to their superior access to credit. They were not confined to port cities, and many did business in inland parts of Korea. Generally speaking, Japanese traders were more interested in quick profits, while the Chinese established relationships with customers. The earliest Chinese school in Korea, the Joseon Hwagyo Primary School, was established in 1902 in Incheon.

Under Japanese rule

By 1910, when Korea formally came under Japanese rule, the number of Chinese in Korea had risen to 12,000. Chinese migrants established schools in Seoul in 1910, Busan in 1912, Sinuiju in 1915, Nampho in 1919, and Wonsan in 1923.

The number of Chinese in Korea would expand to 82,661 by 1942, but contracted sharply to 12,648 by 1945 due to economic hardships faced during World War II.

Division of Korea

North Korea
After the surrender of Japan and the liberation of Korea from Japanese rule, Chinese living in the northern half of Korea quickly established new schools and rebuilt Chinese-language education, with aid from the Chinese Communist Party (CCP). In April 1949, the CCP's Northeast Administrative Committee formally handed control of these schools over to the North Korean government, which began some efforts to integrate them into the national educational system. Early financial assistance from the North Korean government actually helped to maintain and expand Chinese education; the schools continued operation even during the Korean War, and the era after the cessation of hostilities up to around 1966 was described as a "golden era" for the schools. After that time, the North Korean government began to pursue a policy of reform and indigenisation towards the schools. However, as of the late 1990s, there were still four Chinese middle schools which followed the PRC curriculum. Some of their graduates go on to PRC universities; for example, Jinan University in Guangzhou had over 100 overseas Chinese students from North Korea . Yanbian University in the Yanbian Korean Autonomous Prefecture of China also began offering training programmes for teachers in overseas Chinese schools in North Korea beginning in 2002; 38 students from their first class graduated in 2005.

Being foreign citizens, North Korea's Chinese people were not eligible to join the ruling Korean Workers Party or advance in the military or the civil bureaucracy. On the other hand, they were allowed somewhat greater freedoms, such as the right to own a radio that was not sealed to only allow being tuned to North Korean stations (as long they did not listen to foreign stations in the presence of North Koreans). More importantly, since around 1980 they were allowed to travel abroad, and participate in the important and profitable export-import business. After the PRC government came out in support of United Nations Security Council Resolution 1874 in June 2009, which imposed sanctions in North Korea, it was reported that North Korean surveillance and repression of Chinese residents had increased, and many had chosen to avoid making trips out of the country to avoid scrutiny. One Chinese resident was allegedly charged with espionage. Some Chinese in North Korea managed to flee to South Korea, but the South Korean government refused to grant them South Korean citizenship, so they became stateless.

The population of PRC citizens in North Korea was estimated as 14,351 persons (in 3,778 households) in 1958, shrinking to a mere 6,000 by 1980, as they had been encouraged by the North Korean government to leave for China in the 1960s and 70s. Recent estimates of their population vary. China's official Xinhua News Agency published a figure of 4,000 overseas Chinese and 100 international students in 2008. The Chosun Ilbo, a South Korean newspaper, gave a higher estimate of 10,000 people in 2009. They live mostly in Pyongyang and in the areas near the Chinese border.

South Korea

Prior to and during the Korean War, many Chinese residing in the northern half of the Korean peninsula migrated to the southern half. After the division of Korea, the Chinese population in South Korea would remain stable for some time; however, when Park Chung Hee took power in a coup on May 16, 1961, he began to implement currency reforms and property restrictions which severely harmed the interests of the Chinese community, spurring an exodus. Incheon once had the largest Chinese population in Korea, but as the pace of emigration increased, the number diminished. It is estimated that only 26,700 of the old Chinese community now remain in South Korea; they largely hold Republic of China nationality. 

However, in recent years, immigration from mainland China has increased; 696,861 persons of PRC nationality have immigrated to South Korea, making them 55.1% of the total 1,139,283 foreign citizens living in South Korea. Among them are 488,100 of Korean descent (70% of PRC citizens in South Korea, and 40% of the total number of foreign citizens), and 208,761 of other ethnicities. Most of these new residents live in Seoul and its surroundings.

There is a Chinese-language primary school in Myeong-dong, as well as a high school in Seodaemun.

Secondary migration
Due to the South Korean regulations in the 1960s which limited foreign property ownership, many Chinese in South Korea left the country. During the 1970s, 15,000 are estimated to have moved to the United States, and another 10,000 to Taiwan. Further outmigration occurred during the 1997 Asian Financial Crisis. Others went to the PRC after its reform and opening up, to pursue commercial opportunities or simply to return to their ancestral hometowns. For example, in Rizhao, Shandong alone, there are 8,200 returned overseas Chinese.

Many Chinese from Korea who migrated to the U.S. have settled in areas with large Korean American communities, such as Los Angeles, and have tended to integrate into the Korean American rather than Chinese American community. Yet, some who went to the United States or Taiwan found they could not adapt to life there either due to linguistic and cultural barriers, and ended up returning to South Korea, in a form of circular migration.

History of Overseas Chinese in Korea
Overseas Chinese are persons born in China who subsequently settled in and work in other countries. The origin of overseas Chinese in Korea can be found in the Im-O Military Revolt in 1882. At that time, the Chinese military leader  came to fetch the Chinese military 4000 people in order to rectify the Im-O Military Revolt in Korea and the settlement of Overseas Chinese began from the Qing Dynasty merchants that came along to procure munitions. As the Qing Dynasty concession was set to near Incheon Jemulpo Port in 1884, in earnest, the Overseas Chinese came to Korea and was nationally spread. But overseas Chinese society was atrophied because of various institutional limits and discrimination of the government. Since then, Korea conducted favorable policy for foreigners. In 1998, overseas Chinese have become increasingly stable as 22,917 people In 2001. And the rise of China and the 21st century global era, especially, Since the 1997 IMF crisis, as importance of foreign capital was emphasized, Overseas Chinese in Korea has arranged the foundation of a new leap forward.

Cuisine

Religion
It has been documented that most Chinese in South Korea are followers of Chinese folk religion, Buddhism and Taoism. Chinese have established some folk temples dedicated to various gods, which provide networks linking back to mainland China or Taiwan. Otherwise, there are no formal Chinese Buddhist and Taoist temples in Korea. Chinese Buddhists attend temples of Korean Buddhism. Many Chinese belong to I-Kuan Tao, a religious movement originating from Chinese folk religion. Since the 1990s, Christianity has made some inroads among the Chinese of Korea, with at least one Chinese-language church established by a pastor from Taiwan. Chinese Catholics attend Korean Catholic churches.

Education

There are multiple ROC Chinese international schools in South Korea:

 Seoul Chinese Primary School 
 Seoul Overseas Chinese High School
 Yeongdeugpou Korea Chinese Primary School
 Overseas Chinese Elementary School Busan
 Overseas Chinese Middle and High School Busan
 Overseas Chinese Elementary School Daegu
 Overseas Chinese Middle and High School Daegu
 Overseas Chinese School Incheon
 Suwon Zhongzheng Chinese Elementary School
 Overseas Chinese Elementary School Uijongbu
 Wonju Chinese Elementary School
 Chungju Chinese Elementary School
 Onyang Chinese Elementary School
 Kunsan Chinese Elementary School

Criminal image 
According to the Korean Justice Ministry in 2010, the crime rate of the 610,000 Chinese in the country was at 2.7%, which was lower than the 3.8% crime rate of native South Koreans.

However, according to politics professor Lee Jean-young at Inha University, many Chinese of Korean descent, who mostly came from rural areas and had a low level of education, did not follow public etiquette rules during the early years of their settlement, such as spitting on streets and littering anywhere. He added that this combined with local media reporting of crimes by ethnic Korean-Chinese people and their depiction as criminals on TV had increased South Korean animosity towards them. With the prevalence of Korean ethnic nationalism, a 2015 survey had 59% of South Korean respondents expressing negative perceptions of Joseonjok and online hate speech has been documented in some top comments for sites such as Nate and Naver.

Notable people

Athletes
Hu In-jeong, volleyball player (Originally from Taiwan)
So So-kyeong, former baseball player for the Kia Tigers (Originally from Taiwan)

Solo entertainers
Ha Hee-ra, actress, spouse of actor Choi Soo-jong (Taiwanese father)
Ju Hyun-mi, Korean trot singer (Korean-Chinese parents)
Yu Xiaoguang, actor, husband of Choo Ja-hyun (Originally from Dandong, Liaoning, China)
Zhang Liyin, pop singer with SM Entertainment (Originally from Chengdu, Sichuan, China)

Band members
Super Junior former member Han Geng (Originally from Mudanjiang, Heilongjiang, China)
Super Junior-M former member Henry Lau (Hong Kong father and Taiwanese mom)
Super Junior-M member Zhou Mi, the leader of the group (Originally from Wuhan, Hubei, China)
F(x) members Amber and Victoria Song, the leader of the group (Amber: Taiwanese American-Taiwanese parents/Victoria Song: Originally from Qingdao, Shandong, China)
EXO-M member Lay Zhang (Zhang Yixing) and former members Kris Wu, Lu Han, and Huang Zitao (Lay Zhang: Originally from Changsha, Hunan, China/Kris Wu: Originally from Guangzhou, Guangdong,, China/Lu Han: Originally from Beijing, China/Huang Zitao: Originally from Qingdao, Shandong, China)
NCT members Qian Kun, Dong Sicheng (Winwin), Wong Yukhei (Lucas), Huang Renjun and Zhong Chenle, Xiao Dejun, Huang Guanheng (Hendery), and Liu YangYang (Qian Kun: Originally from Fujian, China/Winwin: Originally from Wenzhou, China/Lucas Wong: Originally from Sha Tin, Hong Kong/Huang Renjun: Originally from Jilin, China/Zhong Chenle: Originally from Shanghai, China/Xiao Dejun: Originally from Guangdong, China/Hendery: Originally from Macau/YangYang: Originally from New Taipei City, Taiwan)
Miss A members Meng Jia and Wang Feifei (Meng Jia: Originally from Loudi, Hunan, China/Wang Feifei: Originally from Haikou, Hainan, China)
Got7 members Jackson Wang and Mark Tuan (Jackson Wang: Originally from Kowloon Tong, Hong Kong/Mark Tuan: Taiwanese descent)
Tzuyu, member of girl group Twice (Originally from East District, Tainan, Taiwan)
Elkie Chong, member of girl group CLC (Originally from Tai Po District, Hong Kong)
Yan An, member of boy group Pentagon (Born in Hokkaido, Japan, but raised in Shanghai, China)
(G)I-dle members Song Yuqi and Yeh Shuhua (Song Yuqi: Originally from Beijing, China/Yeh Shuhua: Originally from Taoyuan, Taiwan)
Cosmic Girls members Cheng Xiao, Wu Xuanyi and Meng Meiqi (Cheng Xiao: Originally from Shenzhen, Guangdong, China/Wu Xuanyi: Originally from Haikou, Hainan, China/Meng Meiqi: Originally from Luoyang, Henan, China)
SEVENTEEN members Wen Junhui and Xu Minghao (The8) (Wen Junhui: Originally from Shenzhen, Guangdong, China/The8: Originally from Anshan, Liaoning, China)
Zhou Jieqiong, member of girl group Pristin and former member of I.O.I (Originally from Taizhou, Zhejiang, China)
Liu Xiening (Sally), member of girl group Gugudan (Originally from Luohu District, Shenzhen, Guangdong, China)
Cao Lu, member of girl group Fiestar (Originally from Zhangjiajie, Hunan, China)
Handong, member of girl group Dreamcatcher (Originally from Wuhan, Hubei, China)
Tasty members Zheng Xiaolong and Zheng Dalong (Both originally from Jilin, China)
Cross Gene former members Chu Xiao Xiang (Casper) and Gao Jianing (J.G.) (Casper: Originally from Shanghai, China/J.G.: Originally from Baicheng, Jilin, China)
Lai Kuan-lin, former member of boy group Wanna One, and contestant on survival reality show Produce 101. Later debuted as a duo with Wooseok from Pentagon (Originally from Taipei, Taiwan)
ViVi, member of girl group Loona (Originally from Hong Kong)
UNIQ members Zhou Yixuan, Li Wenhan, Wang Yibo (Zhou Yixuan: Originally from Shengzhou, Zhejiang, China/Li Wenhan: Originally from Hangzhou, Zhejiang, China/Wang Yibo: Originally from Luoyang, Henan, China)
Wang Mengyu (Aurora), member of girl group Nature (Originally from Xi'an, Shaanxi, China)
Wang Yiren, member of girl group Everglow (Originally from Hangzhou, Zhejiang, China)
Ning Yizhuo, member of girl group Aespa (Originally from Harbin, Heilongjiang, China)
Yao Mingming, former BLK member (Originally from Yangquan, Shanxi, China)
Mayna, member of girlgroup Hot Issue (Born in Romania, but raised in Wenzhou, Zhejiang, China)
Guo Jiajia (Jia), Kelly (Lin Weixi), member of girl group Tri.be (Jia: Originally from Taipei, Taiwan/Kelly: Born in Taipei, Taiwan, but raised in Kaohsiung, Taiwan)
Shen Xiaoting, member of girl group Kep1er (Originally from Chengdu, Sichuan, China)

Politics
Roh Moo-hyun, 16th president of South Korea (ancestors from Dongyang, Zhejiang, China)
Roh Tae-woo, 13th president of South Korea (ancestors from Jinan, Shandong, China)

See also
Incheon Chinatown
Korean clan names of foreign origin
Koreans in China
Koreans in Taiwan

Notes

References

Sources

Further reading

Also published in Chinese as 

 
 
Demographics of North Korea
Chinese
Chinese
Korea under Japanese rule